Neoconger is a small genus of eels of the family Moringuidae. It contains these described species:

 Neoconger mucronatus Girard, 1858 (ridged eel)
 Neoconger tuberculatus (Castle, 1965) (swollengut worm eel)
 Neoconger vermiformis C. H. Gilbert, 1890 (smalleye spaghetti-eel)

References

Moringuidae